Sand Hutton is a village and civil parish which forms the larger part of the Claxton and Sand Hutton grouped parish council, in the Ryedale district of North Yorkshire, England, about  north-east of York.

History
The village is mentioned in the Domesday Book as Hottune in the Bulford hundred. Before the Norman invasion the manor was shared between Sprot and Gospatric, son of Arnketil. Afterwards they were split between the Crown and Hugh, son Baldric who installed Wulfbert of Hutton as lord of the manor. The latter part of the manor passed eventually to the Mowbray family until 1604 when the title became unused. The other part of the manor was in the possession of the Percy family of Kildale in the early 13th century. Other families that had possession included the Grays of York and the Thwaite family.

The manor was once owned by an eccentric Englishman, Sir Robert Walker, Bt. He had his own narrow gauge steam railway, which provided transport around his large estate, and a fire brigade.

The name is derived from Old English words hoh and -tun meaning  a hill or spur of projecting land (hill) and settlement. The prefix Sand  was added later to denote the type of soil in the area and distinguish it from other Huttons in the area.

Governance
The village lies within the Thirsk and Malton UK Parliament constituency. It also lies within the Hovingham & Sheriff Hutton electoral ward of North Yorkshire County Council and the Ryedale South West ward of Ryedale District Council.

The Parish Council has six members with representation split equally between the two villages of the Parish.

Geography
The village is located almost halfway between the A64 and A166 to the east of York. The nearest settlements are Claxton  to the north and Upper Helmsley  to the south.

The 2001 UK Census, which separated the village records, recorded the population of Sand Hutton as 193, of which 158 were over sixteen years of age. There were 81 dwellings of which 54 were detached. By the time of the 2011 Census the population had increased to 213.

The Department for Environment, Food and Rural Affairs's Food and Environment Research Agency is sited at Sand Hutton.

Amenities
There is a school, Sand Hutton CE Primary, which is in the catchment area of Huntington School in York for secondary education. It serves the villages of Gate Helmsley, Upper Helmsley, Buttercrambe, Harton, Bossall, Claxton and Flaxton. The school was built by Sir James Walker in 1861 and was enlarged by his grandson.

There is a community hall and is located in an area popular with shooting and other field sports. The village and most of the land is owned by the Church of England Commissioners, who bought it from the Walker family. Located east and west of the village there are numerous pits used for fishing. The Community Hall houses a small library.

Religion

The village has a church dedicated to St Mary. The modern building was erected between 1840 and 1842. In the churchyard are the remains of the 12th century St Leonards Chapel. Both are Grade II Listed buildings.

References

External links

Villages in North Yorkshire
Civil parishes in North Yorkshire
Ryedale